The men's long jump event at the 2023 European Athletics Indoor Championships wil held on 3 March at 9:10 (qualification) and 5 March at 10:12 (final) local time.

Medalists

Records

Results

Qualification 
Qualification: Qualifying performance 7.95 (Q) or at least 8 best performers (q) advance to the Final.

Final

References 

2021 European Athletics Indoor Championships
Long jump at the European Athletics Indoor Championships